Tower House School is an independent prep school for boys aged 4 to 13
. Founded in 1932, it is located in East Sheen, near Richmond Park, in the London Borough of Richmond upon Thames, England.

Notable former pupils 

 Adam Boulton
 Tom Hardy
 Rory Kinnear
 Mark Lester
 Robert Pattinson
 Stuart J. Russell 
 Jack Whitehall
 Louis Theroux
Samuel Joslin

Curriculum 

Tower House follows the ISEB curriculum. The main subjects taught are:

History
TPR
Geography
Science
Mathematics
English
French
Latin

Tower House does 11+ and common entrance (13+)

References

External links 

Tower House School Profile on the ISC website
Profile on the Good Schools Guide

Educational institutions established in 1932
Private boys' schools in London
Preparatory schools in London
Private schools in the London Borough of Richmond upon Thames
1932 establishments in England